was a town located in Chiisagata District, Nagano Prefecture, Japan.

As of March 1, 2004, the town had an estimated population of 26,392 and a density of 304.93 persons per km². The total area was 86.55 km².

On April 1, 2004, Tōbu, along with the village of Kitamimaki (from Kitasaku District), was merged to create the city of Tōmi.

External links
Tōmi official website 

Dissolved municipalities of Nagano Prefecture
Tōmi, Nagano